In Arabic music, a mizmār (plural مَزَامِير mazāmīr) is any single or double reed wind instrument. In Egypt, the term mizmar usually refers to the conical shawm that is called zurna in Turkey and Armenia.

Mizmar is also a term used for a group of musicians, usually a duo or trio, that play a mizmar instrument along with an accompaniment of one or two double-sided bass drums, known in Arabic as tabl baladi or simply tabl. 

Mizmars are usually played in Egypt at either weddings or as an accompaniment to belly dancers. In Lebanon, the Palestinian Territories, and Syria, it is influenced by the Anatolian/Armenian zurna, a higher-pitched version of the mizmar, and may also be known in those countries as a zamr (زمر) or zamour, as well as mizmar. In Algeria a similar instrument is called ghaita or rhaita (غيطة). Along with belly dancing, the mizmar may accompany the dabke, a folkloric line dance done in Lebanon, Syria, Palestine, and Iraq.

See also 
 Mizmar (dance)

References

External links 
 Mizmar. Dominik Photo Images of the making

Middle Eastern culture
Single oboes with conical bore
Arabic musical instruments
Ancient Egyptian musical instruments